The Nevada Department of Public Safety (NDPS) is a governmental agency in the U.S. state of Nevada. The department is responsible for the protection and safety of residents and visitors.

The agency is headquartered at 555 Wright Way in Carson City.

Organization
The Director of the Nevada Department of Public Safety is appointed by the Governor of Nevada. must be confirmed by the Nevada Senate The director is assisted in managing the Department by one deputy director and several division directors. 

The Department of Public Safety (DPS) is divided into eight Divisions and five Offices:

 Director
 Deputy Director 
 Nevada Capitol Police Division
 Emergency Management Division
 Nevada State Police 
 Nevada Investigation Division
 Nevada Parole and Probation  
 Records, Communications & Compliance
 Nevada State Fire Marshal 
 Nevada Training Division
 Office of Criminal Justice Assistance
 Office of Professional Responsibility
 Office of Traffic Safety
 Office of Cyber Defense Coordination
 Office of Homeland Security

Investigation Division
The Nevada Investigation Division has dedicated resources to proactively enforce criminal violations throughout the State of Nevada, and focuses its efforts in several areas: major crime investigations, drug enforcement, pharmaceutical diversion, auto theft, and criminal intelligence analysis and homeland security as conducted by the Nevada Threat Analysis Center (NTAC). It carries out enforcement of controlled substance laws, provides investigative services to all criminal justice agencies, and supports law enforcement statewide through the collection and dissemination of criminal and threat information.

See also 

 List of law enforcement agencies in Nevada
 Denver S. Dickerson

References

External links
Department of Public Safety

State law enforcement agencies of Nevada
Organizations based in Carson City, Nevada